Virginia Mary Staudt (Sexton) (1916–1997) was a psychologist who was the author of numerous publications in the history of American and international psychology.

Early life and education
Virginia Mary Staudt  was born in New York City on August 30, 1916, as the youngest of four children to Philip Henry Staudt, a special patrol officer for the Interborough Rapid Transit Company, and Kathryn Philippa (Burkard) Staudt, who was a designer and sample maker of infant’s and children’s wear prior to marrying Philip. Staudt’s parents highly valued academic achievements when it came to raising their children. In 1933, Staudt entered Hunter College of the City University of New York (CUNY) after graduating from Cathedral High School in New York City. Staudt graduated from CUNY in 1936 with a B.A. cum laude in the classics and was also elected to Phi Beta Kappa and to Eta Sigma Phi, the classics’ honor society. During her senior year of college, she worked as a teacher for Hunter College Model Elementary School, Hunter College High School, and George Washington High School. Her goal after graduating was to become a high school teacher of Latin or Greek, but unable to fulfill her dream, due to the scarcity of jobs caused by the Great Depression, she decided to get her master's degree in experimental psychology at the Fordham University Graduate School of Arts and Science in February 1938. Staudt received her postdoctoral training in clinical psychology at New York State Psychiatric Institute and another one in neuroanatomy at Columbia University.

On January 21, 1961, she married Richard J. Sexton, Ph.D., an English professor at Fordham University. With this marriage Sexton became a stepmother to three girls and one boy ranging from the ages of eight to twenty-one. The youngest of her stepchildren Richard Sexton holds a Ph.D. in psychology and the second youngest Mary Sexton is a doctoral candidate in educational administration.

Contributions and achievements
After quitting her job as a lecturer at Notre Dame College of Staten Island, Virginia Staudt Sexton worked as a guidance director at Fordham University. While at Notre Dame College she opened a psychology lab, created a psychology major, and became associate professor and chair of the psychology department. While working at Fordham she conducted research on shock therapy and psychosurgery for schizophrenic patients. Sexton had published over one hundred articles, several scholarly monographs, and seven books. She spent the bulk of her career at Lehman College in the Bronx.  After her retirement there, she continued working at St. John's University in Queens, NY.

History and philosophy of psychology
Virginia Staudt Sexton had contributed to national and internationally in the history and philosophy of psychology. Sexton is known for her contributions of linking psychology to Catholicism, one of the books that reflected this linkage is Catholics in Psychology: A Historical Survey which was translated in Spanish.  Sexton works drew attention to the contribution of Catholic psychologists, including Edward A. Pace, the first American Catholic and priest to study with Wilhelm Wundt. She aided in the affiliation of the American Catholic Psychological Association (ACPA) with the APA where she served as president of the APA’s Division of Philosophical Psychology and its Division of Humanistic Psychology. Sexton work with ACPA was aimed at helping facilitate employment opportunities for Catholic psychologists. She also promoted many international issues because she believed that psychologists “must develop an international vision of their field” and research.

Notes

References 
Denmark, F. L., & Russo, N.F. (1990). Virginia Staudt Sexton. In A. N. O’Connell & N.F. Russo (Eds.), Women in Psychology: A Bio-bibliographic Sourcebook (pp. 285–289). New York, NY:  Greenwood Press.

20th-century American psychologists
American women psychologists
Hunter College alumni
Physicians from New York City
1916 births
1997 deaths
20th-century American women